Frozen Hearts is a 1923 American silent comedy film starring Stan Laurel. One of a number of films he made before teaming up with Oliver Hardy, here peasant Stan duels with the ruling elite in Tsarist Russia for the love of his girl. The film also featured Laurel's common law wife Mae Laurel.

Cast
 Stan Laurel as Peasant Ivan Kektumoff
 James Finlayson as General Sappovitch
 Katherine Grant as Sonia, the peasant girl
 Mae Laurel as Princess
 Pierre Couderc as Count Alexis Pifflevitch
 George Rowe as Soldier
 Sammy Brooks as The general's second
 Tyler Brooke as Bit Role (uncredited)
 Jack Gavin as Bit Role (uncredited)
 William Gillespie as Spectator at duel (uncredited)
 Ena Gregory as Bit Role (uncredited) (unconfirmed)
 Earl Mohan as Bit Role (uncredited)

See also
 List of American films of 1923
 Stan Laurel filmography

References

External links

1923 films
1923 short films
1923 comedy films
Silent American comedy films
American silent short films
American black-and-white films
Hal Roach Studios short films
American comedy short films
1920s American films